Kingsman: The Secret Service is the soundtrack to the film of the same name, composed by Henry Jackman and Matthew Margeson. It was released on CD on February 13, 2015 by La-La Land Records.

Track listing

Songs not included in the soundtrack, but featured in the film include the following:

 Dire Straits – "Money for Nothing"
 Dizzee Rascal – "Bonkers"
 Rudimental (feat. John Newman) – "Feel the Love"
 Lynyrd Skynyrd – "Free Bird"
 Edward Elgar – "Pomp & Circumstance"
 KC & The Sunshine Band – "Give It Up"
 Bryan Ferry – "Slave to Love"
 Take That – "Get Ready for It"
 Iggy Azalea (featuring Ellie Goulding) – "Heavy Crown"

References

External links

2015 soundtrack albums
Film scores
La-La Land Records soundtracks
Kingsman (franchise)
Henry Jackman soundtracks